Harin Pathak (born 20 July 1947) is an Indian politician who was a member of the fourteenth Lok Sabha of India. He represented the Ahmedabad East constituency of Gujarat and is a member of the Bharatiya Janata Party.

Phatak was denied a ticket to contest the 2014 Loksabha Elections by BJP. He was replaced by Bollywood actor Paresh Rawal.

Pathak was Minister of State for Defence Production in Atal Bihari Vajpayee's third cabinate from October 1999 to November 2000. Pathak was force to resigned along with Gujarat Health Minister Ashok Bhatt in a case of instigating a mob leading to the lynching of Head Constable Laxman Desai during an anti-quota agitation in Gujarat in April 1985.   

He was an English teacher in Nalanda Vidhyalay at Ahmedabad. He was a corporator in Ahmedabad Municipal Corporation for several years. He was one of the rare politician who worked in municipal corporation and directly elected as member of parliament in Loksabha.

References

External links
 Official biographical sketch in Parliament of India website

Politicians from Ahmedabad
Bharatiya Janata Party politicians from Gujarat
Living people
1947 births
India MPs 2004–2009
India MPs 2009–2014
People from Panchmahal district
Lok Sabha members from Gujarat
India MPs 1989–1991
India MPs 1991–1996
India MPs 1996–1997
India MPs 1998–1999
India MPs 1999–2004
Rashtriya Swayamsevak Sangh members